Chund Bharwana (Chund Bhaiwāna) is a town of Jhang District in Punjab Province of Pakistan. It lies at the intersection of two main highways, the Jhang–Lalian road and Jhang–Sargodha road. Chund Bharwana is situated between two rivers, the Jhehlum and the Chenab. People intending to visit towns like Shahjewan, Marri Gujjraan, Pir Kot, Salyana, Chela, Jhagar, Haveli Sheikh Rajoo, Kala Baali, and Lalian, Pind Hassan khan pass through Chund Bharwana.

References

External links
 photographs of Chund Bharwana roads Panoramio 

Populated places in Jhang District
Jhang District